The National University of Cuyo (UNCuyo) is the largest center of higher education in the province of Mendoza, Argentina.

As of 2005, the university had 12 academic schools in the city of Mendoza and a delegation in the city of San Rafael (province of Mendoza), in addition to the Balseiro Institute, which is the most developed institute of Physics research in Argentina, located in the city of San Carlos de Bariloche (province of Río Negro). It includes the University Technological Institute which offers technical education in four other cities in Mendoza province. Moreover, UNCuyo is also devoted to improving education due to having 7 other buildings working as High Schools:

 C.U.C. (Colegio Universitario Central "Gral. Jose de San Martin")
 Escuela de Comercio Martín Zapata
 Liceo Agrícola Domingo Faustino Sarmiento
 Escuela del Magisterio
 Escuela de Agricultura
 D.A.D (Departamento de Aplicación Docente)
 Escuela Carmen Vera Arenas

History
The UNCuyo was established on March 21, 1939 by the presidential decree 26971. The university was established to offer tertiary education provision in the region of Cuyo (the provinces of Mendoza, San Juan and San Luis). At its foundation the university was composed of some existing higher education colleges, and new ones were incorporated. Regional affiliations were established in Human Sciences, Medicine, Agronomy and Economics in Mendoza, Engineering and Architecture in San Juan, and Natural Sciences in San Luis. These links remained in place until 1973. That year the National University of San Juan and the National University of San Luis were established from the adjunct faculties of the National University of Cuyo already in these regions. Thereafter, the National University of Cuyo concentrated itself in Mendoza, in addition to a campus in Río Negro Province: the Balseiro Institute.

Schools

School of Engineering

Industrial Engineering
Civil Engineering
Petroleum Engineering
Mechatronics Engineering
Architecture (since 2012)
Computer Science (Since 2017)

Graduate
 PhD in Engineering
 Master in Logistics and Supply Chain Management
 Master in Environmental Engineering
 Specialization in Environmental Engineering
 Master in Energy
 Master in Structural Engineering
 Diploma in Administration and Direction of Projects
 Diploma in Administration and Control of Buildings
 Diploma in Management of Good Quality
 Diploma in Management of Innovations and Technologies of Information and Communication.

Balseiro Institute (San Carlos de Bariloche, Río Negro)

Physics
Nuclear Engineering
Mechanical Engineering
Telecommunications Engineering

Graduate
PhD in Physics
PhD in Nuclear Engineering
PhD in Engineering Sciences
Master of Physic Sciences
Master of Medical Physics
Master of Engineering.
Specialization Nuclear Energy Technological Applications

School of Arts and Plastic Design

Art
History of Art
Sculpture
Graphic design
Industrial design
Scenic design
Voice
Musicology
Choral Direction
Instruments
Dramatic Arts
Theatre Production

School of Economic Sciences

Accountancy
Business Administration
Economics
Logistics

Graduate
MBA
MBA - Executive
Master in Management of Agroindustrial Business
Master in Management of H.R. (Human Resources)
Specialization in Costs and Management of Business
Specialization in Technology Management
Specialization in Labour Unions
Course of Merging, Union and Scission of Enterprises.
Course of Financial Strategy
Course of Foreign Trade
Course of Accountings
There are many others. For further information please visit: http://www.fce.uncu.edu.ar/paginas/index/cursos

School of Exact and Natural Sciences

Biology
Mathematics
Physics
Chemistry

For more information, see the school's web site.

School of Medicine

Medicine
Nursing
Anaesthesiology
Clinical Pathology
Surgery
Haematology
Radiology

School of Social and Political Sciences

PhD in Social Sciences
Political Science and Public Administration
Sociology
Social Work
Communication

School of Law
Law

Graduate
PhD in Law
Specialization in Law of Damages
Master of Administrative Law
Specialization and Master of Magistrature and Steps of the Judicial process
Specialization in Labour Law
Course of Family Law
Course of History for the Bicentennial

School of Humanities

Philosophy
Philology
History
Geography
French
English
Italian
Education Sciences
Tourism
Languages (Spanish, English, Italian, Portuguese, French, German, Japanese, Chinese, Hebrew, Russian, among others)

School of Dentistry

Dentistry
Dental Hygiene

Elementary and Special-Needs Education
Primary Education
Education for the deaf
Speech Therapy
Education for the blind

School of Agricultural Sciences
Agricultural Engineering
Bromatology
Natural Resources Renovanble Engineering

Applied Sciences (San Rafael, Mendoza)
Food Engineering
Chemical Engineering
Mechanical Engineering
Chemical Analysis
Industrial Chemistry
Bromatology

Recent research
In recent research conducted by UNCuyo's students it was discovered how methods of cutting and preparing food can affect how many nutrients are retained in a meal. Notably they found that the thiosulfinates (that inhibit platelet aggregation and microparticle shedding) found in garlic and onions do not form until crushing or cutting. The research also demonstrated that steaming instead boiling is preferable as vegetables retain more of their water-soluble vitamins.

See also
 Argentine universities

References

External links

Science and Education in Argentina
Argentine Higher Education Official Site

1939 establishments in Argentina
Argentine national universities
Educational institutions established in 1939
Forestry education
National University of Cuyo
Universities in Mendoza Province
National University of Cuyo
National University of Cuyo